The Mary Immaculate Girls' High Schools are located in Kalina and Borivali in the city of Mumbai, India. They are Catholic schools, established and administered by the Mission Sisters of Ajmer, members of an Indian religious congregation. The school is under the religious jurisdiction of the Roman Catholic Archbishop of Mumbai.

Mary Immaculate Girls' High School, Borivli and Kalina are affiliated to the Maharashtra State Board of Education, Mumbai. It started as a primary school in June 1957, and was upgraded to a high school in 1963. The students are known as Marians. There are also schools by the same name, run by the Mission Sisters of Ajmer in Ajmer and Kota, Rajasthan.

The school
More than 10,000 students study in the school. The school is a center for the SSC board exams. A former teacher, Rajalakshmy Nair, from the Kalina division, won the President's Award for best teacher. Another teacher, Saramma Chandy from the Borivali Division, won the Ishalakshi Gangadharan Memorial Award for Excellence in Science Teaching in 2004.She later won the President 's award for Best teacher in 2005.

The Borivali Campus of Mary Immaculate Girls High School is located on a small hillock called Mt. Poinsur. The Borivali division set up and runs Karuna Hospital which provides medical services.

The school arranges Christmas and Diwali parties.

The motto and the emblem
The motto is 'Seek Ye Wisdom', which was Mother Mary Matilda's motto.

The emblem is a shield. Inscribed on it are the words of the school motto: "Seek ye Wisdom". There is a lily engraved on the emblem which symbolises purity of mind and body. The radiant sun on the emblem symbolises the enlightenment that education brings to the mind of every Marian. The letters 'I' and 'M' stand for Mary Immaculate, the patroness.

Celebrating the golden jubilee
In the academic 2013-2014 the school at Kalina celebrated its golden jubilee. They arranged a grand function consisting of three musicals put up by the different sections of the school. The KG section put up "red riding hood", the primary section,"hansel and gretel" and the secondary section the classic,"king and I."

The school celebrates the Feast of the Immaculate Conception of The Virgin Mary on 8 December.

School canteen days
Every month the school keeps canteen where students have food stalls to serve their own home cooked food. The money generated from this event goes towards school maintenance and welfare.

School magazine
The school distributes Marian Notes to the students. It has pictures and articles regarding the events of that academic year. Articles are written by the students and teachers. Capable students are given the opportunity to be a part of the editorial board of the magazine.

Notable alumni
 Deena Mehta, chief executive officer, Asit C. Mehta Investment Intermediates Ltd
 Bhairavi Raichura, tele-actress in series like Hum Paanch and Balika Vadhu
 Drashti Dhami, actress in Dill Mill Gayye and in Geet - Hui Sabse Parayi
 Mahima Makwana, actress in Sawaare Sabke Sapne... Preeto and Sapne Suhane Ladakpan Ke
 Rucha Gujarathi, television actress
 Aahana Kumra, actress

See also

References 

Catholic secondary schools in India
Christian schools in Maharashtra
Girls' schools in Maharashtra
High schools and secondary schools in Mumbai
Borivali
Educational institutions established in 1963
1963 establishments in Maharashtra